Richard Mead Atwater Benson (November 8, 1943 – June 22, 2017) was an American photographer, printer, and educator who used photographic processing techniques of the past and present.

"He is perhaps best known for his innovations in photographic offset printing techniques and, later, ink-jet printing."

Benson was awarded two Guggenheim Fellowships and a MacArthur Fellowship. His work is held in the collections of Los Angeles County Museum of Art, Metropolitan Museum of Art, San Francisco Museum of Modern Art and Whitney Museum of American Art.

Biography
Born in Newport, Rhode Island, Benson attended the St. George's School, then spent three months at Brown University before dropping out and joining the United States Navy. He learned about lenses and optics in his time in the navy. He then worked as a printer, primarily in printing photographs, first in Connecticut and then in Newport. 

Benson began teaching photography at Yale University in 1979 and was dean of the Yale School of Art from 1996 to 2006. Benson had a broad range of interests in the photographic print: aluminum, silver, platinum, palladium, and ink. Working in these different mediums, sometimes learning forgotten crafts and sometimes creating new ones, by the 1970s he was convinced that ink and the modern photo offset press—with its ability to make multiple passes that build an image from multiple layers of ink—possessed a potential for photographic rendition beyond anything else previously known. By the 1990s he began working on the relationship between the computer and traditional photographic imagery, and applied the lessons from this in the production of long-run offset books of work by different photographers, in both black and white and color.

He was the uncle of stone carver Nicholas Benson, the owner of The John Stevens Shop. Nick Benson was named a MacArthur Fellow in 2010, making the Bensons one of two families with multiple MacArthur fellows.

Publications
Lay This Laurel. Eakins, 1973. Co-authored with Lincoln Kirstein. .
Photographs from the Collection of the Gilman Paper Company. White Oak, 1985. . With acknowledgements by Howard Gilman, an introduction by Pierre Apraxine, notes to the plates by Lee Marks and an afterword by Benson. Benson made multiple halftone films from each photograph, exposed those films to plates, and printed the plates on a single-color sheet-fed offset printing press.
A Maritime Album: 100 Photographs and Their Stories. Newport News, Virginia: Mariners' Museum; Yale University Press, 1997. Co-authored with John Szarkowski. .
A Yale Album: The Third Century. A Yale Tercentennial Book. Yale University Press, 2001. .
The Printed Picture. Museum of Modern Art, 2008. . Exhibition catalog of an eponymous 2016 exhibition at MoMA, co-curated with Peter Galassi.

Awards

Honors and awards given to him
1978: Guggenheim Fellowship, John Simon Guggenheim Memorial Foundation
1981: National Endowment for the Arts Photography Fellowship
1986: MacArthur Fellowship, MacArthur Foundation
1986: Guggenheim Fellowship, John Simon Guggenheim Memorial Foundation
Two National Endowment for the Arts publication grants, Federal government of the United States
Rhode Island Governor's Medal for the Arts

Honors and awards in honor of him
Richard Benson Prize, Yale School of Art: annual prize awarded for leadership in the photography program

Collections
Benson's work is held in the following permanent collections:
Los Angeles County Museum of Art, Los Angeles, CA: 3 prints (as of March 2019)
Metropolitan Museum of Art, New York: 70 prints (as of March 2019)
Museum of Modern Art, New York: 21 prints (as of March 2019)
San Francisco Museum of Modern Art, San Francisco, CA: 11 prints (as of March 2019)
Whitney Museum of American Art, New York: 8 prints (as of March 2019)

References

External links
"A Single Person Making A Single Thing" Calvin Tomkins, Profiles, The New Yorker, 1990
"Richard Benson", View Camera, 1997
"Richard Benson", Pace/MacGill Gallery
The Printed Picture by Richard Benson, 2008
Richard Benson Lectures at Yale

1943 births
2017 deaths
20th-century American photographers
21st-century American photographers
Artists from Newport, Rhode Island
Brown University alumni
Photographers from Rhode Island
St. George's School (Rhode Island) alumni
Yale University faculty